Orfeo Pizzoferrato (born 19 January 1951) is an Italian former cyclist. He competed in the individual pursuit event at the 1976 Summer Olympics.

References

External links
 

1951 births
Living people
Italian male cyclists
Olympic cyclists of Italy
Cyclists at the 1976 Summer Olympics
Cyclists from Abruzzo
Sportspeople from the Province of L'Aquila